The Western Australia Rugby Union (RugbyWA) is the governing body of rugby union in Western Australia. It was founded in 1893 and the inaugural 4 team competition commenced in 1895. The highest competition run by the union is the RugbyWA FMG Premier Grade.

The Union was founded in 1893. The inaugural 4 team competition commenced in 1895 with the I Zingari, Fremantle, Swans and Midland Junction Club's taking part. The WARU Senior Grade competition was contested from 1895 to 1913.
 
The Rugby Football code went into recess in the west from the 1914 season until 1928 when 4 Clubs; Wanderers, Rangers, Wallabies and Fremantle revived the First Grade Club Competition.
 

In 2004, RugbyWA successfully secured the fourth Australian Super 12 licence, entering a team in the expanded Super 14 competition from 2006, called the Western Force. RugbyWA has also established a series of development programs. The development team is the Perth Spirit, which has competed in the Australian Rugby Championship in 2007 and the National Rugby Championship since 2014.

Structure
There are currently 10 RugbyWA Board Members, President, D G Redpath who was re-elected in March 2012. Dr R J Perry is the current Chairman and Mr Arthur Hill is the current Patron.

The RugbyWA is a not-for-profit organisation run by its shareholding organisations – WA clubs and affiliated bodies (juniors, schools, referees, women's and country rugby). RugbyWA incorporates both Professional and Community Rugby. There is no private ownership of RugbyWA with profit generated re-invested into the game at all levels in Western Australia.

Clubs

Premier Grade (1st Grade)

Notable players 

Bob Thompson first player selected to play for the Wallabies from a WA Club
John Welborn (retired, first Western Australian born to represent the Wallabies) – NSW Waratahs, Leicester Tigers, CA Brive, Western Force, Australia
Brett Sheehan – NSW Waratahs, Queensland Reds, Australia
Adam Wallace-Harrison – ACT Brumbies, Australia A
Kieran Longbottom – Western Force
Dane Haylett-Petty – Western Force, Australia
Scott Higginbotham – Queensland Reds
David Collis – Queensland Reds
Darren Murphy – Queensland A
Will Brock – Perth Spirit, Australia sevens
Daniel Montagu – Nottingham R.F.C., Leicester Tigers
Ryan Tyrrell – Perth Spirit
Dan Bailey – Perth Spirit
Salesi Ma'afu – Western Force, Joondalup Brothers RUFC

Other Leagues

Other Perth Grades 
 ARKs
 Bunbury
 Mandurah
 Perth Irish Rugby
 Southern Lions
 Swan Suburbs

South West Competition 
 Collie
 Dunsborough
 Leeuwin-Margaret River

Great Southern Competition 
 Albany Denmark
 Dryandra-Narrogin
 Katanning
 Mount Barker

Eastern Goldfields Competition 
 Boulder
 Bushwackers
 Kambalda
 Stormers
 WA School of Mines

Representative teams 

The Western Force compete in the National Rugby Championship, until the competition got postponed in 2020 because of Covid-19. Perth Gold team competes in the NRC Division 2 tournament. From 2000 to 2008 and from 2022, it played in the Australian Rugby Shield.

Honours
 2019 NRC Division 2 Champions (defeated NSW Country 15-5)
 Australian Rugby Shield Winners (2003, 2005)

See also

List of Australian club rugby union competitions
Perth Spirit
Rugby union in Western Australia
Western Force

References

External links
 
 Official website of the Western Force
 TWF – Unofficial WA Rugby Website

Australian rugby union governing bodies
Rugby union in Western Australia
Sports governing bodies in Western Australia
1893 establishments in Australia
Sports organizations established in 1893